In sociology, siege mentality is a shared feeling of victimization and defensiveness—a term derived from the actual experience of military defences of real sieges. It is a collective state of mind in which a group of people believe themselves constantly attacked, oppressed, or isolated in the face of the negative intentions of the rest of the world. Although a group phenomenon, the term describes both the emotions and thoughts of the group as a whole, and as individuals.

The result is a state of being overly fearful of surrounding peoples, and an intractably defensive attitude.

The related term bunker mentality may be used in the context of businesses facing competition or downsizing, with a similar paradigm applying to some religious groups.

Characteristics
Among the consequences of a siege mentality are black and white thinking, social conformity, and lack of trust, but also a preparedness for the worst and a strong sense of social cohesion.

Examples
Siege mentalities existed at a national level as a result of ideological or political isolation. David Brooks said that it has led to political polarization in the United States, and, in North Korea, it is arguably encouraged by both the government—to help justify their continuance in power—or the opposition—to help justify their overthrowing the government through violent means.  The Economist described Israel's blockade of the Gaza Strip as leaving Israel with a siege mentality. 

Sociologically, the term may refer to persecution feelings by anyone in a group that views itself as a threatened minority, as with the early psychoanalysts. This can be used for example in the field of sports, where coaches or managers often create a siege mentality in their players by highlighting an environment of hostility from outside the club (whether the hostility is real or exaggerated is irrelevant).

Siege mentalities are particularly common in business, the result of competition or downsizing, though here the (smaller-scale) alternative of "bunker mentality" (analogous to soldiers who have taken shelter in a bunker) may be used. Some religious groups may have this paradigm, particularly if they are not traditional mainstream groups.

Literary analogies
Seamus Heaney used the phrase "Besieged within the siege" to describe the feeling of the beleaguered Catholic minority in Northern Ireland within the broader siege mentality of the Protestant community itself.

See also

Related psychological behaviours:
 Defence mechanisms: can arise when one feels the need to defend oneself while being under siege.
 Persecution complex: may develop because one feels victimized or the need to defend against an outgroup.

References

Sieges
Paranoia
Political psychology
Sociological theories